Arkadelphia Aquatic Park is a water park located in Arkadelphia, Arkansas. During the 2006 season, nearly 25,000 individuals visited the park.  This was up over 20% from 2005.  Roughly 40% of the visitors are from out of town.

Location
The Aquatic Park is located in Feaster Park at 2575 Twin Rivers Drive.

Honors and awards
The Park was given the 2004 top facility award by the Arkansas Recreation and Parks Association.

Attractions and features
8-lane, 25-meter swimming area
Diving area within 8-lane area
1-meter springboard
Drop Waterslide
Open-flume Water slide
Plunge area for slides outside of lane area
Umbrella style water fountain
Shaded bench area in zero depth entry
Kids' frog slide
3 floating play pieces
Four arching sprays
Zero depth entry
Grassy areas for sunbathing
Concessions
Shaded picnic areas
Free use of Lounge chairs
Lifeguards on duty
Music while you swim

References

External links
 Official Site

Buildings and structures in Arkadelphia, Arkansas
Water parks in Arkansas
Tourist attractions in Clark County, Arkansas